Obrąb  is a village in the administrative district of Gmina Przasnysz, within Przasnysz County, Masovian Voivodeship, in east-central Poland.

References

Villages in Przasnysz County